Mari Finstad Bergum (born 16 March 1998) is a Norwegian handball player who plays for Neptunes de Nantes.

She also represented Norway in the 2017 Women's Junior European Handball Championship, placing 7th, and in the 2016 Women's Youth World Handball Championship, placing 4th.

She is also a part of Norway's national recruit team in handball.

Achievements
Norwegian League:
Silver medalist: 2017/18

EHF European League:
Winner: 2021

References

1998 births
Living people
Norwegian female handball players
Sportspeople from Gjøvik